Within the nephron of the kidney, the descending limb of loop of Henle is the portion of the renal tubule constituting the first part of the loop of Henle.

Physiology

The permeability is as follows:

Also, the medullary interstitium is highly concentrated (because of the activity of the ascending limb), leading to a strong osmotic gradient from the descending limb to the medulla.

Because of these factors, the concentration of the urine increases dramatically in the descending limb. Osmolality can reach up to 1400 mOsmol/kg by the end of the descending limb.

Histology
The epithelium of the Thick segment is low simple cuboidal epithelium.  The epithelium of the Thin segment is simple squamous.

They can be distinguished from the vasa recta by the absence of blood, and they can be distinguished from the thick ascending limb by the thickness of the epithelium.

Nomenclature
Like the ascending limb, the descending limb has thick and thin portions. However, this distinction is not as important physiologically as in the ascending limb, so often the two are treated as one structure. The thick descending limb is less important than the thin descending limb, so often the terms "descending limb" and "thin descending limb" are used interchangeably.

Some sources simply refer to a "thin limb". In this context, the thin ascending limb of loop of Henle would be included.

Additional images

References

Kidney anatomy